This is a list of women's college ice hockey coaches with 250 or more career wins. The all-time leader in wins is Bill Mandigo, head coach at Middlebury College since 1989, with a career record of 625-158-48. The career leader in winning percentage is Kevin Houle, head coach at Plattsburgh State from 2003 to the present, with a record of 449-54-26 (.873). Russ McCurdy, head coach at New Hampshire from 1978 to 1992, has the second highest winning percentage with a record of 264-36-10 (.868).

Key

Coaches with 250 career wins
Statistics correct as of the end of the 2022-2023 college women's ice hockey season.

See also 

 List of college men's ice hockey coaches with 400 wins

References

Coaches with 250 wins
Ice Hockey, Women
 
Ice hockey